

The Friedrichshafen G.I (factory designation FF.36 or FF.30) was a prototype heavy bomber aircraft that was built in Germany by Flugzeugbau Friedrichshafen in 1915. It was Karl Gehlen's first design for the company, and although it was not produced in quantity, it provided the foundation for the later, highly successful bombers culminating in the G.III.

Design and development
The Friedrichshafen G.I first flew in 1915 and was originally conceived as a battle-plane but the design emphasis was shifted to the bomber role when the battle-plane concept proved unworkable. The G.I was a biplane with a crew of three and armament of a single machine gun mounted on a gun ring in the nose of the aircraft. The front part of the fuselage was covered with plywood while the rear half of the fuselage was fabric covered as were the wings and the tail surfaces. The biplane wings were braced by three pairs of interplane struts on each side of the fuselage while the tail unit was a box-shaped biplane unit with two rudders mounted between the tips of the horizontal stabilizers. The fuselage was attached to the lower wing and the two engine nacelles were suspended between the wings by a system of struts. Each nacelle housed a six-cylinder 110 kW (150 hp) Benz Bz.III engine in a pusher configuration.

Operators

 Luftstreitkrafte

Specifications (G.I)

See also

References

Bibliography

Further reading
 
 

1910s German bomber aircraft
G.I
Twin-engined pusher aircraft
Aircraft first flown in 1915
Biplanes